The Douglas B-23 Dragon is an American twin-engined bomber developed by the Douglas Aircraft Company as a successor to (and a refinement of) the B-18 Bolo.

Design and development
Douglas proposed a number of modifications designed to improve the performance of the B-18. Initially considered a redesign, the XB-22 featured 1,600 hp Wright R-2600-1 Twin Cyclone radial engines. The complete B-18 redesign was considered promising enough by the USAAC to alter the original contract to produce the last 38 B-18As ordered under Contract AC9977 as the B-23. The design incorporated a larger wingspan with a wing design very similar to that of the DC-3, a fully retractable undercarriage, and improved defensive armament. The B-23 was the first operational American bomber equipped with a glazed tail gun position. The tail gun was a .50 calibre (12.7 mm) machine gun, which was fired from the prone position by a gunner using a telescopic sight.

The first B-23 flew on July 27, 1939 with the production series of 38 B-23s manufactured between July 1939 and September 1940.

Operational history

While significantly faster and better armed than the B-18, the B-23 was not comparable to newer medium bombers like the North American B-25 Mitchell and Martin B-26 Marauder. For this reason, the 38 B-23s built were never used in combat overseas, although for a brief period they were employed as patrol aircraft stationed on the west coast of the United States. The B-23s were primarily relegated to training duties, although 18 of them were later converted as transports and redesignated UC-67.

The B-23 also served as a testbed for new engines and systems. For example, one was used for turbosupercharger development by General Electric at Schenectady, New York. Another was used for testing cabin pressurization.

After World War II, many examples were used as executive transports, with appropriate internal modifications, and as a result a large number have survived, both in public and private collections. Howard Hughes (among others) used converted B-23s as personal aircraft.

Operators

 United States Army Air Corps

Variants
B-23
Twin-engined bomber version of the B-18 with modified fuselage, 38 built.
C-67
Conversion to utility transport with provision for glider towing, 12 conversions from B-23, redesignated UC-67 in 1943.
UC-67
C-67 redesignated in 1943.

Surviving aircraft

Ecuador
UC-67
39-031 (HC-APV) - Ecuadorian Air Museum, Quito.

United States

On display
B-23
39-0036 - McChord Air Museum in McChord AFB, Washington.
39-0051 - Pima Air & Space Museum adjacent to Davis-Monthan Air Force Base in Tucson, Arizona.
UC-67
39-0047 - Castle Air Museum at the former Castle Air Force Base in Atwater, California.

Under restoration or in storage
B-23
39-0033 - to airworthiness by ATW Aviation in Marana, Arizona.
39-0037 - in storage at the National Museum of the United States Air Force at Wright-Patterson AFB in Dayton, Ohio.
39-0038 - for display at the 1941 Historical Aircraft Group Museum in Geneseo, New York.
UC-67
39-0057 - in storage at Fantasy of Flight in Polk City, Florida.
39-0063 - to airworthiness by private owner in Anchorage, Alaska. Currently stored at Grant County International Airport, Moses Lake, Washington. Flew in 2017.

Wrecks
B-23
39-0052 - wreck at Loon Lake, Idaho.

Specifications (B-23 Dragon)

See also

References

Notes

Bibliography
 Francillon, René J. McDonnell Douglas Aircraft since 1920. London, Putnam, 1979. .

 Mondey, David. The Hamlyn Concise Guide to American Aircraft of World War II. London: Hamlyn Publishing Group, 2002, (republished 1996 by the Chancellor Press), First edition 1982. .

External links

 Douglas B-23 Dragon – National Museum of the United States Air Force

B-23 Dragon
1930s United States bomber aircraft
Aircraft first flown in 1939
Twin piston-engined tractor aircraft